"(Now You See Me) Now You Don't" is a song written by Tony Lane, Jess Brown and David Lee, and recorded by American country music artist Lee Ann Womack.  It was released in August 1999 as the third single from her CD Some Things I Know.  The song peaked at number 12 on the Billboard Hot Country Singles & Tracks.

Critical reception
Editors at Billboard gave the song a positive review and wrote, "Clocking in under three minutes, it's a short, saucy little number with a lively melody, excellent guitar work, and a clever lyric about a woman on her way out of a sour relationship. Womack's voice is a combination of childlike vulnerability and spurned-woman desperation as she perfectly conveys the emotion in the lyric. This has all the elements necessary to become a summertime hit--and possibly Womack's long-awaited chart-topper."

Chart performance

Year-end charts

References

1999 singles
1999 songs
Lee Ann Womack songs
MCA Nashville Records singles
Songs written by Jess Brown
Songs written by Tony Lane (songwriter)
Song recordings produced by Mark Wright (record producer)
Songs written by David Lee (songwriter)